Tubby protein homolog is a protein that in humans is encoded by the TUB gene.

This gene encodes a member of the Tubby family of bipartite transcription factors. The encoded protein may play a role in obesity and sensorineural degradation. The crystal structure has been determined for a similar protein in mouse, and it functions as a membrane-bound transcription regulator that translocates to the nucleus in response to phosphoinositide hydrolysis. Two transcript variants encoding distinct isoforms have been identified for this gene.

Interactions
TUB (gene) has been shown to interact with PLCG1.

References

Further reading

External links